Mollabürhan (also, Mollaburan, Molla-buran, and Mollaburkhan) is a village in the Qubadli Rayon of Azerbaijan.

Mollabürhan is Azeri village in Qubadli

References 

Populated places in Qubadli District